San José de los Llanos is a municipality (municipio) of the San Pedro de Macorís province in the Dominican Republic. Within the municipality there are two municipal districts (distritos municipales): Gautier and El Puerto.

Notable people
 

Francisco Alvarado Arellano (1840–1917), Venezuelan military man and politician

See also
List of municipalities and municipal districts of the Dominican Republic

References

Populated places in San Pedro de Macorís Province
Municipalities of the Dominican Republic